"Child of Winter (Christmas Song)" is a song by American rock band the Beach Boys that was released as a standalone single on December 23, 1974. Written by Brian Wilson and Stephen Kalinich, it was the only Beach Boys single issued between the albums Holland and 15 Big Ones. The B-side was "Susie Cincinnati".

Background
In a 1997 interview, Kalinich said of the song,

Recording
An early version with Dennis Wilson on lead vocals and Carl Wilson singing the bridge is reported to exist.

Release history
When released in other countries, the single featured the live version of "Good Vibrations" from The Beach Boys In Concert as a B-side.

"Child of Winter (Christmas Song)" was included on the band's 1998 compilation Ultimate Christmas.

Personnel
Per Stephen Kalinich.
The Beach Boys
Mike Love – lead vocal
Brian Wilson – "Grinch voice", "everything else"
Carl Wilson – guitar
Dennis Wilson – drums
Additional personnel
Carnie Wilson – sleigh bell
Wendy Wilson – sleigh bell
Stephen Kalinich – kazoo

References

1974 singles
The Beach Boys songs
Songs written by Brian Wilson
Song recordings produced by Brian Wilson
American Christmas songs
Songs written by Stephen Kalinich
Reprise Records singles
1974 songs
Songs about children